Buffalo Bill in Tomahawk Territory is a 1952 Western starring Clayton Moore as Buffalo Bill. Directed by Bernard B. Ray and produced by Edward Finney as his final Western, the film was the final appearance of sidekick Slim Andrews.

Plot
Buffalo Bill is sent by the government to stop the caravans of the Native American chief White Cloud.

Cast 
 Clayton Moore as Buffalo Bill Cody
 Slim Andrews as Cactus
 Charles Harvey as Lieutenant Bryan
 Rodd Redwing as Running Deer
 Chief Yowlachie as Chief White Cloud
 Chief Thundercloud as Black Hawk 
 Merrill McCormick as Rider (uncredited)

References 
 American Film Institute catalog by Alan Gevinson

External links
 https://www.imdb.com/title/tt0044455/

1952 Western (genre) films
1952 films
1950s English-language films
American Western (genre) films
United Artists films
Films directed by Bernard B. Ray
Cultural depictions of Buffalo Bill
American black-and-white films
1950s American films